Eric Crudgington Fernihough (17 February 1905 – 23 April 1938) was a British motorcycle racer.

Career 
In 1927, Fernihough made his only participation in the Isle of Man TT, finishing thirteenth in the 250 cc Lightweight TT.

In the first half of the 1930s, Fernihough took part in many international races for the Excelsior Motor Company. In April 1930 he won the North West 200 race in Northern Ireland in the 175 cc category. In the Belgian Grand Prix of the same year, Fernihough finished second to the local rider Yvan Goor. In September 1930, he won the UMF Grand Prix in Pau, France.

In June 1931, Fernihough won his second UMF Grand Prix in the 175 cc category and with it the title of European Champion. That year he also won the Belgian Grand Prix and the 250 cc category races at the North West 200 and Swedish TT.

In 1932, Fernihough won the 175 cc races at the Dutch TT, the UMF Grand Prix and the Belgian Grand Prix. 1933 saw Fernihough and Excelsior win their fourth consecutive UMF Grand Prix in the 175 cc class.

Fatal accident

On 23 April 1938, Fernihough crashed while attempting to break the motorcycle land-speed record at Gyón, Hungary.

Statistics

Title 
 1931 – 175 cc European Champion on an Excelsior

Race wins 
(yellow background denotes that the race determined the European Championship)

References

Websites 
 Eric Fernihough at MotorsportMemorial.org

Footnotes 

1905 births
1938 deaths
English motorcycle racers
Motorcycle land speed record people
Sportspeople from Birkenhead